King George was a French ship that the British captured circa 1797. Her new owners renamed her and employed her as a Liverpool-based slave ship. She made three complete voyages carrying slaves from Africa to the West Indies and was lost on her fourth voyage in February 1803 as she returned to Liverpool after having delivered slaves to Havana.

Career

1st slave trading voyage (1798–1799)
Captain Samuel Hensley acquired a letter of marque on 13 February 1798. He sailed from Liverpool on 20 March. King George gathered her slaves at the Congo River. She delivered them to Demerara on 10 September, where she landed 540 slaves. She left Demerara on 4 October and arrived back at Liverpool on 4 January 1799. She had left Liverpool with 54 crew members and she suffered three crew deaths on the voyage.

2nd slave trading voyage (1799–1800)
Captain Radcliffe Shimmins acquired a letter of marque on 5 March 1799. He sailed from Liverpool on 6 April 1799 to gather slaves from the West Coast of Africa. King George delivered 394 slaves to Demerara on 18 March 1800. She departed Demerara on 11 April.  She arrived at Liverpool on 21 June. She had left with 54 crew members and she suffered 16 deaths on the voyage.

3rd slave trading voyage (1800–1802)
Captain Cobb Taylor acquired a letter of marque on 4 September 1800. He sailed from Liverpool on 6 November 1800. She arrived at Demerara on 6 September 1801. There she delivered some 300 slaves. Lloyd's List (LL) reported that she had grounded on the Demerara Bar on 25 September as she sailed for England, but that she was expected to be gotten off slight damage. She sailed from Demerara on 13 November 1801 and arrived back at Liverpool on 18 January 1802. She had left Liverpool with 45 crew members and she suffered 10 crew deaths on the voyage.

4th slave trading voyage (1802–1802)
Captain James Phillips sailed from Liverpool on 19 May 1802. Because he sailed during the Peace of Amiens he did not acquire a letter of marque. King George acquired her slaves at Bonny and delivered 388 to Havana on 1 December 1802. She had sailed with 39 crew members and had lost two by the time she reached Havana. She sailed from Havana on 30 December 1802.

Fate
In February 1803 King George, Phillips, was wrecked on the West Hoyle Bank, in Liverpool Bay. She was on a voyage from Havana to Liverpool.

Notes

Citations

1790s ships
Age of Sail merchant ships of England
Liverpool slave ships
Maritime incidents in 1803
Shipwrecks of England